Boston is a market town and inland port in the borough of the same name in the county of Lincolnshire, England.

Boston is the administrative centre of the wider Borough of Boston local government district. The town had a population of 35,124 at the 2001 census, while the borough had a population of 66,900 at the ONS mid-2015 estimates.

Boston's most notable landmark is St Botolph's Church ("The Stump"), the largest parish church in England, which is visible from miles away across the flat lands of Lincolnshire. Residents of Boston are known as Bostonians. Emigrants from Boston named several other settlements around the world after the town, most notably Boston, Massachusetts, in the United States.

Name

The name "Boston" is said to be a contraction of "Saint Botolph's town", "stone", or "" (Old English, Old Norse and modern Norwegian for a hamlet or farm, hence the Latin villa Sancti Botulfi "St. Botulf's village").
The name "Botulfeston" appears in 1460, with an alias "Boston".

History

Early history
The town was once held to have been a Roman settlement, but no evidence shows this to be the case. Similarly, it is often linked to the monastery established by the Saxon monk Botolph at "Icanhoe" on the Witham in AD 654 and destroyed by the Vikings in 870, but this is now doubted by modern historians. The early medieval geography of The Fens was much more fluid than it is today, and at that time, the Witham did not flow near the site of Boston. Botolph's establishment is most likely to have been in Suffolk. However, he was a popular missionary and saint to whom many churches between Yorkshire and Sussex are dedicated.

The 1086 Domesday Book does not mention Boston by name, but nearby settlements of the tenant-in-chief Count Alan Rufus of Brittany are covered. Its present territory was probably then part of the grant of Skirbeck, part of the very wealthy manor of Drayton, which before 1066 had been owned by Ralph the Staller, Edward the Confessor's Earl of East Anglia. Skirbeck had two churches and one is likely to have been that dedicated to St Botolph, in what was consequently Botolph's town. Skirbeck is now considered part of Boston, but the name remains, as a church parish and an electoral ward.

The order of importance was the other way round, when the Boston quarter of Skirbeck developed at the head of the Haven, which lies under the present Market Place. At that stage, The Haven was the tidal part of the stream, now represented by the Stone Bridge Drain, which carried the water from the East and West Fens. The line of the road through Wide Bargate, to A52 and A16, is likely to have developed on its marine silt levees. It led, as it does now, to the relatively high ground at Sibsey, and thence to Lindsey.

The reason for the original development of the town, away from the centre of Skirbeck, was that Boston lay on the point where navigable tidal water was alongside the land route, which used the Devensian terminal moraine ridge at Sibsey, between the upland of East Lindsey and the three routes to the south of Boston:
 The coastal route, on the marine silts, crossed the mouth of Bicker Haven towards Spalding.
 The Sleaford route, into Kesteven, passed via Swineshead, thence following the old course of the River Slea, on its marine silt levee.
 The Salters' Way route into Kesteven, left Holland from Donington. This route was much more thoroughly developed, in the later Medieval period, by Bridge End Priory.

The River Witham seems to have joined The Haven after the flood of September 1014, having abandoned the port of Drayton, on what subsequently became known as Bicker Haven. The predecessor of Ralph the Staller owned most of both Skirbeck and Drayton, so it was a relatively simple task to transfer his business from Drayton, but Domesday Book in 1086 still records his source of income in Boston under the heading of Drayton, so Boston's name is not mentioned. The Town Bridge still maintains the preflood route, along the old Haven bank.

Growth

After the Norman conquest, Ralph the Staller's property was taken over by Count Alan. It subsequently came to be attached to the Earldom of Richmond, North Yorkshire, and known as the Richmond Fee. It lay on the left bank of The Haven.

During the 11th and 12th centuries, Boston grew into a notable town and port. In 1204, King John vested sole control over the town in his bailiff. That year or the next, he levied a "fifteenth" tax of 6.67% on the moveable goods of merchants in the ports of England: the merchants of Boston paid £780, the highest in the kingdom after London's £836. Thus, by the opening of the 13th century, Boston was already significant in trade with the continent of Europe and ranked as a port of the Hanseatic League. In the thirteenth century it was said to be the second port in the country. Edward III named it a staple port for the wool trade in 1369. Apart from wool, Boston also exported salt, produced locally on the Holland coast, grain, produced up-river, and lead, produced in Derbyshire and brought via Lincoln, up-river.

A quarrel between the local and foreign merchants led to the withdrawal of the Hansards around 1470. Around the same time, the decline of the local guilds and shift towards domestic weaving of English wool (conducted in other areas of the country) led to a near-complete collapse of the town's foreign trade. The silting of the Haven only furthered the town's decline.

At the Dissolution of the Monasteries by Henry VIII during the English Reformation, Boston's Dominican, Franciscan, Carmelite, and Augustinian friaries—erected during the boom years of the 13th and 14th centuries—were all expropriated. The refectory of the Dominican friary was eventually converted into a theatre in 1965 and now houses the Blackfriars Arts Centre.

Henry VIII granted the town its charter in 1545 and Boston had two Members of Parliament from 1552.

17th and 18th centuries

The staple trade made Boston a centre of intellectual influence from the Continent, including the teachings of John Calvin that became known as Calvinism. This, in turn, revolutionised the Christian beliefs and practices of many Bostonians and residents of the neighbouring shires of England. In 1607, a group of pilgrims from Nottinghamshire led by William Brewster and William Bradford attempted to escape pressure to conform with the teaching of the English church by going to the Netherlands from Boston. At that time, unsanctioned emigration was illegal, and they were brought before the court in the Guildhall. Most of the pilgrims were released fairly soon, and the following year, set sail for the Netherlands, settling in Leiden. In 1620, several of these were among the group who moved to New England in the Mayflower.

Boston remained a hotbed of religious dissent. In 1612, John Cotton became the Vicar of St Botolph's and, although viewed askance by the Church of England for his nonconformist preaching, became responsible for a large increase in Church attendance. He encouraged those who disliked the lack of religious freedom in England to join the Massachusetts Bay Company, and later helped to found the city of Boston, Massachusetts, which he was instrumental in naming. Unable to tolerate the religious situation any longer, he eventually emigrated himself in 1633.

At the same time, work on draining the fens to the west of Boston was begun, a scheme which displeased many whose livelihoods were at risk. (One of the sources of livelihood obtained from the fen was fowling, supplying ducks and geese for meat and in addition the processing of their feathers and down for use in mattresses and pillows. Until 2018, the feathery aspect of this was still reflected in the presence of the local bedding company named Fogarty.) This and the religious friction put Boston into the parliamentarian camp in the Civil War, which in England began in 1642. The chief backer of the drainage locally, Lord Lindsey, was shot in the first battle and the fens returned to their accustomed dampness until after 1750.

The later 18th century saw a revival when the Fens began to be effectively drained. The Act of Parliament permitting the embanking and straightening of the fenland Witham was dated 1762. A sluice, called for in the act, was designed to help scour out The Haven. The land proved to be fertile, and Boston began exporting cereals to London. In 1774, the first financial bank was opened, and in 1776, an act of Parliament allowed watchmen to begin patrolling the streets at night.

Modern history
In the 19th century, the names of Howden, a firm located near the Grand Sluice, and Tuxford, near the Maud Foster Sluice, were respected among engineers for their steam road locomotives, threshing engines, and the like. Howden developed his business from making steam engines for river boats, while Tuxford began as a miller and millwright. His mill was once prominent near Skirbeck Church, just to the east of the Maud Foster Drain.

The railway reached the town in 1848, and it was briefly on the main line from London to the north. The area between the Black Sluice and the railway station was mainly railway yard and the railway company's main depôt. The latter facility moved to Doncaster when the modern main line was opened. Boston remained something of a local railway hub well into the 20th century, moving the produce of the district and the trade of the dock, plus the excursion trade to Skegness.

Boston once again became a significant port in trade and fishing in 1884, when the new dock with its associated wharves on The Haven were constructed. It continued as a working port, exporting grain, fertiliser, and importing timber, although much of the fishing trade was moved out in the interwar period.

At the beginning of the First World War, a number of the town's trawlermen, together with some from Grimsby, were taken prisoner after their ships were sunk by German raiders in the North Sea. Their families did not know what had happened to them until late September 1914. The men were taken to Sennelager camp, then on to Ruhleben POW camp, where most remained until repatriated in 1918. A full report of their homecoming is in the Lincolnshire Standard newspaper, January 1918. During the war the port was used by hospital ships and some 4,000 sick or wounded troops passed through Boston. The town was bombed by a Zeppelin on 2 September 1916, injuring three adults and killing a child.

The first cinema opened in 1910, and in 1913, a new town bridge was constructed. Central Park was purchased in 1919, and is now one of the focal points of the town. Electricity came to Boston during the early part of the century, and electrical street lighting was provided from 1924.

In the Second World War, the borough lost 17 civilian dead through enemy air raids. A memorial in Boston Cemetery commemorates them.

The Haven Bridge, which now carries the two trunk roads over the river, was opened in 1966, and a new dual carriageway, John Adams Way, was built in 1976–8 to take traffic away from the town centre. A shopping centre, named the Pescod Centre, opened in 2004, bringing many new shops into the town.

Transport

Railway

The railways came to Boston in 1848 following the building of the East Lincolnshire Railway from Grimsby to Boston and the simultaneous building of the Lincolnshire Loop Line by the Great Northern Railway, which ran between Peterborough and York via Boston, Lincoln, and Doncaster. This line was built before the East Coast Main Line and for a short while put Boston on the map as the GNR's main locomotive works before it was relocated to Doncaster in 1852.

Boston railway station is served by East Midlands Railway on the Poacher Line from Grantham to Skegness. It was the southern terminus of the East Lincolnshire Line to Louth and Grimsby until closure in 1970.

Politics

Boston residents voted strongly (75.6%) in favour of leaving the European Union in the 2016 UK referendum on EU membership, the highest such vote in the country.

Boston Borough Council
In the 2019 Borough elections, the Conservatives were confirmed as the majority party on Boston Borough Council with 16 of the 30 seats, followed by independents with 11.

In May 2007, a single-issue political party, the Boston Bypass Independents campaigning for a bypass to be built around the town, took control of the council when they won 25 of the 32 council seats, losing all but four of them in the subsequent election in 2011.

Governance
Boston received its charter in 1546. It is the main settlement in the Boston local government district of Lincolnshire, which includes the unparished town of Boston and 18 other civil parishes.

Borough Council wards
As of 2015, Boston Borough council consisted of 30 members:

Coastal Ward elects two councillors
Fenside Ward elects two councillors.
Fishtoft Ward elects three councillors.
Five Villages Ward elects two councillors.
Kirton & Frampton Ward elects three councillors.
Old Leake & Wrangle elects two councillors
Skirbeck Ward elects three councillors.
Staniland Ward elects two councillors.
Station Ward elects one councillor.
St Thomas Ward elects one councillor.
Swineshead & Holland Ward elects two councillors.
Trinity Ward elects two councillors.
West Ward elects one councillor.
Witham Ward elects two councillors.
Wyberton Ward elects two councillors.

Lincolnshire County Council divisions 
In 2017, six county council divisions existed for the Borough of Boston, each of which returned one member to Lincolnshire County Council:

 Boston Coastal
 Boston North
 Boston Rural
 Boston South
 Boston West
 Skirbeck

UK Parliament 
The town is part of the Boston and Skegness parliamentary constituency, currently represented by Conservative MP Matt Warman. The town was previously represented for 35 years by Conservative Sir Richard Body.

European Parliament 
Prior to the United Kingdom's departure from the European Union, Boston was part of the East Midlands European Parliament constituency, which elected five members.

Demography

According to the 2001 census, 35,124 people were residing in Boston town, of whom 48.2% were male and 51.8% were female. Children under five accounted for about 5% of the population; 23% of the resident population in Boston were of retirement age. In the 2011 census, the Borough of Boston had a population of 64,600 with 15% of the population having been born outside of the UK and 11% having been born in EU accession countries (2001–2011) such as Poland and Lithuania.
The non-White population made up 2.4% of the total population in 2011.

Arts and culture

Boston has historically had strong cultural connections to the Netherlands, and Dutch influence can be found in its architecture.

Landmarks

The parish church of Saint Botolph is known locally as Boston Stump and is renowned for its size and its dominant appearance in the surrounding countryside.

The Great Sluice is disguised by railway and road bridges, but it is there, keeping the tide out of the Fens and twice a day, allowing the water from the upland to scour the Haven. Not far away, in the opposite direction, was the boyhood home of John Foxe, the author of Foxe's Book of Martyrs.

The Town Bridge maintains the line of the road to Lindsey and from its western end, looking at the river side of the Exchange Building to the right, it is possible to see how the two ends of the building, founded on the natural levees of The Haven, have stood firm while the middle has sunk into the infill of the former river.

From 1552, Bostonians used to have their jail near the Stump (about where the red car in the photograph is located). This is likely to be where the Scrooby Pilgrims were imprisoned in 1607.

There is a statue of Herbert Ingram, founder of The Illustrated London News, in front of the Stump. The statue was designed by Alexander Munro and was unveiled in October 1862. The allegorical figure at the base of the monument is a reference to Ingram's efforts to bring the first piped water to the town. He was also instrumental in bringing the railways to Boston. Born in nearby Paddock Grove, son of a butcher, he was also MP for Boston, from 1856 until his death in 1860, in a shipping accident on Lake Michigan.

 
The seven-storeyed Maud Foster Tower Windmill, completed in 1819 by millwrights Norman and Smithson of Kingston upon Hull for Issac and Thomas Reckitt, was extensively restored in the late 1980s and became a working mill again. It stands next to the drain after which it is named, and is unusual in having an odd number (five) of sails.

The Guildhall in which the Pilgrim Fathers were tried was converted into a museum in 1929. The cells in which the pilgrims are said to have been held at the time of their trial are on the ground floor. After a major refurbishment during which the museum was closed for several years, it reopened in 2008.

The Pilgrim Fathers Memorial is located on the north bank of The Haven a few miles outside the town. Here at Scotia Creek, the pilgrims made their first attempt to leave for the Dutch Republic in 1607.

The ruined Hussey Tower is all that remains of a medieval brick-fortified house, built in 1450, and occupied by John Hussey, 1st Baron Hussey of Sleaford until he was executed in the wake of the Lincolnshire Rising.  east, Rochford Tower is another medieval tower house.

In Skirbeck Quarter, on the right bank of The Haven, is the Black Sluice, the outfall of the South Forty-Foot Drain.

The Prime Meridian passes through the eastern side of Boston, marked by the fairly modern, suburban Meridian Road, which straddles the line after which the road was named.

The annual Boston May Fair has been held in the town since at least 1125. This fair is held during the first week of May, and is one of the few remaining fairs in the country still held in the town centre. By tradition, the fair was officially opened by the mayor at midday on 3 May, although this date has varied in recent years.

The Haven Gallery, opened in 2005, was closed to the public in 2010 in a cost-cutting measure by Boston Borough Council.

Blackfriars is a theatre and arts centre that was formerly the refectory of the Benedictine friary, built in the 13th century and once visited by King Edward I.

Frampton Marsh and Freiston Shore are two nature reserves, managed by the RSPB, which lie on The Wash coast on either side of the mouth of The Haven.

Local economy

Boston's most important industries are food production, including vegetables and potatoes; road haulage and logistics companies that carry the food; the Port of Boston, which handles more than one million tons of cargo per year including the import of steel and timber and the export of grain and recyclable materials; shellfishing; other light industry; and tourism. The port is connected by rail, with steel imports going by rail each day to Washwood Heath in Birmingham, and the port and town are also connected by trunk roads including the A16 and the A52.

Boston's market is held every Wednesday and Saturday in one of England's largest marketplaces, with an additional market and outside auction held on Wednesdays on Bargate Green.

The Town has many local and national stores. Pescod Square shopping centre, located in the centre of town, houses several branded stores including Next, HMV, Waterstones and Wilko. Other big name stores in Boston include New look, Sports direct, Dunelm, TKMAXX and boots. There are several supermarkets, a Tesco and Asda, an Aldi and 2 Lidls. Several Lincolnshire coops are located around the town and both Sainsburys and Morrisons have a small presence. In 2021 a new department store opened in the Town centre called Rebos, filling the hole Oldrids and Downtown left when they vacated their Bargate department store in 2020, after 216 years of service, and moved to a new site on the outskirts of town.

In late 2013, a £100 million development was announced for the outskirts of town on the A16 towards Kirton. This development, named the Quadrant, is split in two phases. Phase one consists of a new football ground for Boston United F.C., 500 new homes, retail and business outlets, and a possible supermarket. This development also includes the beginning of a distributor road that will eventually link the A52 Grantham Road and the A16 together. Phase two, still in the development stage, consists of a possible second new marina, more new homes, and retail units.

Crime 
In 2016, Boston was named as the most murderous place in England and Wales.

Health
In the mid-2000s Boston was shown to have the highest obesity rate of any town in the United Kingdom, with one-third of its adults (31%) considered clinically obese. Obesity has been linked to social deprivation.

Sport
The Princess Royal Arena is located on the Boardsides, just outside Boston. Boston Rugby Football Club is based at the Princess Royal Arena. The club was established in 1927 by Ernst Clark, who had an interest in providing activity for boys.

Football
The town has two nonleague football clubs. The more senior Boston United, nicknamed the Pilgrims, plays in the National League North. The stadium is currently located on York Street in the centre of the town and has an approximate capacity of 6,200. Boston United moved out of their former ground, York Street, for the 2020–21 season, to the Jakeman's stadium on the outskirts of town. The town's second club, Boston Town, nicknamed the Poachers, plays in the United Counties Football League. Its home games are played at their stadium on Tattershall Road, on the outskirts of Boston.

Rowing
Boston Rowing Club, near Carlton Road, hosts the annual  Boston Rowing Marathon each year in mid-September. Crews from throughout the world compete, starting at Brayford Pool in Lincoln, and finishing in times from three to six hours.

Speedway
Speedway racing was staged at a stadium in New Hammond Beck Road in the 1970s and 1980s. The Boston Barracudas raced in the British League Division Two, (now the Premier League) and in 1973 won the League and the Knock-out Cup, with one member winning the League Individual Championship. After the New Hammond Beck Road Stadium was sold for redevelopment in 1988, attempts to secure a new venue in the 1990s failed. A team, known as Boston, raced in the Conference League at King's Lynn.

An advert for a speedway meeting on Thursday 16 July at the greyhound track in Shodfriers Lane in 1936 appeared in The Guardian on 10 July 1936. Other sources now confirm this was a grass track venue.

Swimming
Boston Amateur Swimming Club holds galas and open meets, including the Boston Open, and two yearly club championship events. It trains at the Geoff Moulder Swimming Pool.

Sailing
Witham Sailing Club is based on the banks of the Witham, with its own clubhouse.

Media 
Boston has two weekly newspapers, the Boston Standard and the Boston Target. The Boston Standard (previously Lincolnshire Standard) was founded in the 19th century and has been the main newspaper. The Boston Target is owned by Local World, and is Boston Standard's main rival.

On 22 August 2016, community radio station Endeavour FM started broadcasting across the borough. It had previously been called Endeavour Online and Stump Radio, set up as a collaboration between Blackfriars Arts Centre and Tulip Radio, which first started broadcasting in 2006. It can be heard on frequency 107FM and also online using Radioplayer UK.

Education

Secondary schools
Boston Grammar School an all-male selective school, is on Rowley Road. Its female counterpart, Boston High School is on Spilsby Road. Both schools have sixth forms open to both boys and girls. Haven High Academy is on Marian Road – it was created in 1992 on the site of Kitwood Girls' School following its merger with another secondary modern school, Kitwood Boys' School. The town previously also had a Roman Catholic secondary school, St Bede's in Tollfield Road, but this was closed in 2011 following poor exam results.

Colleges 
Boston College is a predominantly further education college that opened in 1964 to provide A-level courses for those not attending the town's two grammar schools. It currently has three sites in the town. It also took over the site of Kitwood Boys' school in Mill Road following the school's merger with Kitwood Girls' School in 1992, but this was closed in 2012, with the buildings subsequently demolished and housing built on the site.

Independent schools
St George's Preparatory School is the only independent school in the town. Established in 2011, it is housed in a Grade II listed building, the former home of the town architect William Wheeler, and caters for the 3–11 year age group.

Notable Bostonians

Politics 

 Anthony Irby (1547–1625) lawyer and politician sat in the House of Commons for Boston variously from 1589 to 1622
 William Ellis (1609–1680) lawyer, judge and politician who sat in the House of Commons for Boston and Grantham variously between 1640 and 1679
 Herbert Ingram (1811–1860) journalist and politician, founder of The Illustrated London News
 William Garfit (1840–1920) banker and Conservative politician, MP for Boston 1895 to 1906
 Fred Maddison (1856–1937) trade unionist and Liberal politician
 Sir Walter Liddall CBE (1884–1963) Conservative MP for Lincoln from 1931 to 1945
 John McNair (1887–1968) socialist politician
 David Ward (born 1953) Liberal Democrat politician, MP for Bradford East 2010 to 2015
 Robin Hunter-Clarke (born 1992) UKIP politician

Church 
 Sir Thomas Dingley (executed 1539) Catholic martyr
 Simon Patrick (1626–1707) theologian and bishop
 Joseph Farrow (1652–1692) nonconformist clergyman
 Andrew Kippis (1725–1795) nonconformist clergyman in Boston (1746 to 1750) and biographer
 John Platts (1775–1837) Unitarian minister and author, a compiler of reference works
 John James Raven (1833–1906) cleric and headmaster, known as a writer on campanology

Public service 

 Sir Richard Weston (1465–1541) KB courtier and diplomat, Governor of Guernsey
 John Foxe (1516/17–1587) historian and martyrologist 
 Edmund Ingalls (ca.1598–1648) emigrated to Salem in 1628 and founded Lynn, Massachusetts
 John Leverett (1616–1678/9) colonial magistrate, merchant, soldier and governor of the Massachusetts Bay Colony
 George Bass (1771–1803 presumed) naval surgeon and explorer of Australia
 John R. Jewitt (1783–1821) an armourer in Canada, wrote memoirs of his captivity by local indigenous people
 James Richardson (1809–1851) explored Africa, published his travel notes and diaries 
 Frederick Flowers (1810–1886) police magistrate.
 John Conington (1825–1869) classical scholar
 William Henry Wheeler (1832–1915), civil engineer architect, inventor and antiquarian
 Major Walter George Burnett Dickinson FRSE FRCVS TD (1858–1914) veterinary surgeon
 Arthur James Grant (1862–1948) historian
 Arthur Callender (1875–1936) engineer and archaeologist, assisted Howard Carter in excavating Tutankhamun's tomb
 Janet Lane-Claypon, Lady Forber JP (1877–1967) physician and epidemiologist
 Hedley Adams Mobbs (1891–1969) Architect and Philatelist
 Joseph Langley Burchnall (1892–1975) mathematician, introduced Burchnall–Chaundy theory
 Air Vice-Marshal Arthur Lee MC (1894–1975) senior RAF officer and autobiography writer
 Henry Neville Southern (1908–1986) ornithologist
 Victor Emery (1934–2002) specialist on superconductors and superfluidity
 Richard Budge (1947–2016) coal mining entrepreneur
 John Cridland (born 1961) former Director-General of the Confederation of British Industry, Chair of Transport for the North
 Sir Jonathan Van-Tam MBE (born 1964), Deputy Chief Medical Officer for England during the COVID-19 pandemic

Arts and writing 

 John Taverner (c1490–1545) composer and organist
 Pishey Thompson (1784–1862) publisher and antiquarian writer
 George French Flowers (1811–1872) composer and musical theorist, promoted counterpoint
 John Westland Marston (1819–1890) dramatist and critic
 Jean Ingelow (1820–1897) poet and novelist
 Elizabeth Jennings CBE (1926–2001) poet
 Barry Spikings (born 1939) film producer, incl. 1978 film, The Deer Hunter
 Pamela Buchner (born 1939) actress
 Dusty Hughes (born 1947) playwright and director, writing for both the theatre and television
 Brian Bolland (born 1951) comics artist produced most of his work for DC Comics
 Alan Moulder (born 1959) record producer, mixing engineer and audio engineer
 Hilary McKay (born 1959) writer of children's books
 Wyn Harness (1960–2007) journalist at The Independent from its creation in 1986
 Amanda Drew (born 1969) actress, plays May Wright in the BBC soap opera EastEnders
 Robert Webb (born 1972) comedian, actor and writer, one half of Mitchell and Webb
 Carl Hudson (born 1983) pianist and keyboardist
 Georgina Callaghan (born 1986) singer-songwriter, currently lives in Nashville
 Courtney Bowman (born 1995) stage actress and singer

Sport 

 Cyril Bland (1872–1950) first class cricketer 
 Gordon Bolland (born 1943) retired footballer, was player-manager of Boston United F.C.
 Emma Bristow (born 1990) motorcycle trials rider and current Women's World Champion
 Danny Butterfield (born 1979) former footballer, 488 pro appearances
 Simon Clark (born 1967) former footballer and manager, now coach at Charlton Athletic F.C.
 Bernard Codd (c1933–2013) motorcycle road racer, double winner at the 1956 Isle of Man TT motorcycle race
 Dave Coupland (born 1986) professional golfer.
 Crista Cullen MBE (born 1985) Olympic Gold Medal winning English field hockey player
 Anthony Elding (born 1982) professional footballer, over 400 pro appearances
 Howard Forinton (born 1975) footballer, approx. 300 pro appearances
 Simon Garner (born 1959) former footballer, 474 pro appearances for Blackburn Rovers F.C.
 Matt Hocking (born 1978) football defender, over 300 pro appearances
 Bill Julian (1867–1957) football player and coach
 Simon Lambert (born 1989) speedway rider
 Hannah Macleod MBE (born 1984) field hockey player
 Jack Manning (1886–1946) footballer who scored 31 goals from 218 appearances
 Melanie Marshall (born 1982) Olympic athlete, European Gold Medal-winning swimmer, now coach to Olympic Gold medal winner Adam Peaty
 John Oster (born 1978) former footballer, made 487 pro appearances
 Mike Pinner (born 1934) international amateur football goalkeeper, 1956 and 1960 Olympics
 Kieran Tscherniawsky (born 1992) paralympian athlete, category F33 discus

Crime 
 William Frederick Horry (1843–1872) murderer, first to be executed by the long drop method

Town twinning and association

Boston joined the new Hanseatic League, in July 2015, a project for trade, cultural and educational integration. Boston's twin towns include:

Boston, Massachusetts, United States
Laval, France; Boston's link with Laval is one of the oldest twinnings in the world.
Hakusan, Japan

Destinations

See also
Boston United F.C.
Dynamic Cassette International
Endeavour FM – community radio station
Lincs FM – commercial radio station
List of road protests in the UK and Ireland – Boston Bypass is listed

Notes

References

Further reading

External links

Wikisource

 
Market towns in Lincolnshire
Towns in Lincolnshire
Ports and harbours of Lincolnshire
Port cities and towns of the North Sea
Trading posts of the Hanseatic League
Unparished areas in Lincolnshire
Borough of Boston